Cecil Donald Briscoe (March 20, 1940 – October 31, 2004) was an American stage and soap opera actor known for starring in the TV series Dark Shadows.

Early life and education 
Briscoe was born on March 20, 1940, in Scobey, Mississippi. He grew up in a middle class family, where his father took a job as a service manager for Firestone, and his mother worked in admissions at the old City of Memphis Hospital. He earned a scholarship to attend Phillips Exeter Academy, graduating in 1958, and received his bachelor's degree from Columbia College in 1962. He received his master's degree in English literature from Columbia Graduate School of Arts and Sciences in 1965. While at Columbia University, he and future Dark Shadows co-star Roger Davis were classmates and acted in the Columbia Players, then headed by their classmate, and future director Brian De Palma.

Career 
Briscoe's early acting credits include New York stage appearances in Come Back Little Sheba, The Tavern, and Friends and Romans. He played Tony Merritt #2 on Days of Our Lives in 1966. He also made a guest appearance during the second season of I Dream of Jeannie, which aired March 20, 1967. He played an officer in the episode entitled A Secretary is Not a Toy. In 1968, he joined the cast of the Gothic soap opera Dark Shadows playing Chris Jennings, Tom Jennings, Timothy Shaw, and Chris Collins. His sexy, brooding good looks made him an instant favorite among fans, and he became the subject of countless fan magazine photos and articles. While on Dark Shadows, Briscoe appeared in the groundbreaking Off-Broadway play Boys in the Band in the role of Donald. He appeared in 95 Dark Shadows episodes before leaving the show in 1970. Briscoe appeared in the 1970 film House of Dark Shadows as Todd, fiancee of Carolyn (Nancy Barrett), and the target of her vampire attacks. After appearing in the MGM film House of Dark Shadows (1970), Briscoe abruptly left Dark Shadows, suffering from bipolar disorder and retiring from acting.

Personal life 
Briscoe died on October 31, 2004, at his home in Memphis, Tennessee from heart disease.

References

External links

1940 births
2004 deaths
Male actors from Mississippi
20th-century American male actors
American male soap opera actors
Male actors from Memphis, Tennessee
People from Yalobusha County, Mississippi
People with bipolar disorder
Phillips Exeter Academy alumni
Columbia College (New York) alumni